Maaske Dome is an icecapped, dome-like elevation  long, rising above the northern part of the California Plateau in Antarctica. It was mapped by the United States Geological Survey from ground surveys and U.S. Navy air photos in 1960–63, and was named by the Advisory Committee on Antarctic Names for Lieutenant Gary L. Maaske, a U.S. Navy helicopter pilot at McMurdo Station during the 1962–63 and 1963–64 seasons.

References

Ice caps of Antarctica
Bodies of ice of Marie Byrd Land